Epischnia thewysi is a species of snout moth in the genus Epischnia. It was described by Patrice J.A. Leraut in 2002 and is known from Morocco.

References

Moths described in 2002
Phycitini
Endemic fauna of Morocco
Moths of Africa